The 1977 Minnesota Golden Gophers baseball team represented the University of Minnesota in the 1977 NCAA Division I baseball season. The head coach was Dick Siebert, serving his 30th year.

The Golden Gophers lost the College World Series, defeated by the Arizona State Sun Devils.

Roster

Schedule 

! style="" | Regular Season
|- valign="top" 

|- align="center" bgcolor="#ccffcc"
| 1 || March 20 || at  || Unknown • Seguin, Texas || 3–1 || 1–0 || 0–0
|- align="center" bgcolor="#ffcccc"
| 2 || March 20 || at Texas Lutheran || Unknown • Seguin, Texas, Texas || 4–5 || 1–1 || 0–0
|- align="center" bgcolor="#ccffcc"
| 3 || March 21 || vs  || Disch-Falk Field • Austin, Texas || 5–4 || 2–1 || 0–0
|- align="center" bgcolor="#ffcccc"
| 4 || March 21 || at  || Disch-Falk Field • Austin, Texas || 2–3 || 2–2 || 0–0
|- align="center" bgcolor="#ffcccc"
| 5 || March 22 || at Texas || Disch-Falk Field • Austin, Texas || 2–3 || 2–3 || 0–0
|- align="center" bgcolor="#ffcccc"
| 6 || March 22 || at Texas || Disch-Falk Field • Austin, Texas || 2–5 || 2–4 || 0–0
|- align="center" bgcolor="#ffcccc"
| 7 || March 24 || at  || Travis Field • College Station, Texas || 1–8 || 2–5 || 0–0
|- align="center" bgcolor="#ffcccc"
| 8 || March 24 || at Texas A&M || Travis Field • College Station, Texas || 5–9 || 2–6 || 0–0
|-

|- align="center" bgcolor="#ffcccc"
| 9 || April 9 || at  || Cap Timm Field • Ames, Iowa || 6–7 || 2–7 || 0–0
|- align="center" bgcolor="#ccffcc"
| 10 || April 9 || at Iowa State || Cap Timm Field • Ames, Iowa || 4–0 || 3–7 || 0–0
|- align="center" bgcolor="#ccffcc"
| 11 || April 10 || at Iowa State || Cap Timm Field • Ames, Iowa || 2–0 || 4–7 || 0–0
|- align="center" bgcolor="#ccffcc"
| 12 || April 10 || at Iowa State || Cap Timm Field • Ames, Iowa || 4–2 || 5–7 || 0–0
|- align="center" bgcolor="#ccffcc"
| 13 || April 12 ||  || Bierman Field • Minneapolis, Minnesota || 4–1 || 6–7 || 0–0
|- align="center" bgcolor="#ccffcc"
| 14 || April 12 || St. Cloud State || Bierman Field • Minneapolis, Minnesota || 19–4 || 7–7 || 0–0
|- align="center" bgcolor="#ccffcc"
| 15 || April 13 ||  || Bierman Field • Minneapolis, Minnesota || 2–1 || 8–7 || 0–0
|- align="center" bgcolor="#ccffcc"
| 16 || April 13 ||  || Bierman Field • Minneapolis, Minnesota || 2–1 || 9–7 || 0–0
|- align="center" bgcolor="#ccffcc"
| 17 || April 16 || at  || Ray Fisher Stadium • Ann Arbor, Michigan || 8–0 || 10–7 || 1–0
|- align="center" bgcolor="#ffcccc"
| 18 || April 16 || at Michigan || Ray Fisher Stadium • Ann Arbor, Michigan || 2–3 || 10–8 || 1–1
|- align="center" bgcolor="#ccffcc"
| 19 || April 17 || at  || John H. Kobs Field • East Lansing, Michigan || 5–4 || 11–8 || 2–1
|- align="center" bgcolor="#ccffcc"
| 20 || April 17 || at Michigan State || John H. Kobs Field • East Lansing, Michigan || 6–2 || 12–8 || 3–1
|- align="center" bgcolor="#ccffcc"
| 21 || April 19 ||  || Bierman Field • Minneapolis, Minnesota || 8–1 || 13–8 || 3–1
|- align="center" bgcolor="#ccffcc"
| 22 || April 23 ||  || Bierman Field • Minneapolis, Minnesota || 7–3 || 14–8 || 4–1
|- align="center" bgcolor="#ccffcc"
| 23 || April 23 || Purdue || Bierman Field • Minneapolis, Minnesota || 13–1 || 15–8 || 5–1
|- align="center" bgcolor="#ccffcc"
| 24 || April 24 ||  || Bierman Field • Minneapolis, Minnesota || 15–7 || 16–8 || 6–1
|- align="center" bgcolor="#ccffcc"
| 25 || April 24 || Illinois || Bierman Field • Minneapolis, Minnesota || 8–2 || 17–8 || 7–1
|- align="center" bgcolor="#ccffcc"
| 26 || April 26 ||  || Bierman Field • Minneapolis, Minnesota || 5–3 || 18–8 || 7–1
|- align="center" bgcolor="#ccffcc"
| 27 || April 26 || Wisconsin–Oshkosh || Bierman Field • Minneapolis, Minnesota || 12–2 || 19–8 || 7–1
|- align="center" bgcolor="#ffcccc"
| 28 || April 30 || at  || Wells Field • Evanston, Illinois || 3–6 || 19–9 || 7–2
|- align="center" bgcolor="#ccffcc"
| 29 || April 30 || at Northwestern || Wells Field • Evanston, Illinois || 6–1 || 20–9 || 8–2
|-

|- align="center" bgcolor="#ccffcc"
| 30 || May 1 || at  || Guy Lowman Field • Madison, Wisconsin || 6–3 || 21–9 || 9–2
|- align="center" bgcolor="#ccffcc"
| 31 || May 1 || at Wisconsin || Guy Lowman Field • Madison, Wisconsin || 12–0 || 22–9 || 10–2
|- align="center" bgcolor="#ccffcc"
| 32 || May 3 || vs  || Bierman Field • Minneapolis, Minnesota || 4–3 || 23–9 || 10–2
|- align="center" bgcolor="#ccffcc"
| 33 || May 3 || vs Winona State || Bierman Field • Minneapolis, Minnesota || 13–0 || 24–9 || 10–2
|- align="center" bgcolor="#ccffcc"
| 34 || May 7 ||  || Bierman Field • Minneapolis, Minnesota || 2–1 || 25–9 || 10–2
|- align="center" bgcolor="#ccffcc"
| 35 || May 7 || Wisconsin–Stevens Point || Bierman Field • Minneapolis, Minnesota || 8–7 || 26–9 || 10–2
|- align="center" bgcolor="#ccffcc"
| 36 || May 8 ||  || Bierman Field • Minneapolis, Minnesota || 13–0 || 27–9 || 10–2
|- align="center" bgcolor="#ccffcc"
| 37 || May 8 || Wisconsin–La Crosse || Bierman Field • Minneapolis, Minnesota || 7–2 || 28–9 || 10–2
|- align="center" bgcolor="#ccffcc"
| 38 || May 11 ||  || Bierman Field • Minneapolis, Minnesota || 9–1 || 29–9 || 10–2
|- align="center" bgcolor="#ccffcc"
| 39 || May 11 || St. Olaf || Bierman Field • Minneapolis, Minnesota || 8–3 || 30–9 || 10–2
|- align="center" bgcolor="#ccffcc"
| 40 || May 14 ||  || Bierman Field • Minneapolis, Minnesota || 4–2 || 31–9 || 11–2
|- align="center" bgcolor="#ccffcc"
| 41 || May 14 || Indiana || Bierman Field • Minneapolis, Minnesota || 6–0 || 32–9 || 12–2
|- align="center" bgcolor="#ccffcc"
| 42 || May 15 ||  || Bierman Field • Minneapolis, Minnesota || 3–0 || 33–9 || 13–2
|- align="center" bgcolor="#ccffcc"
| 43 || May 15 || Ohio State || Bierman Field • Minneapolis, Minnesota || 3–2 || 34–9 || 14–2
|- align="center" bgcolor="#ffcccc"
| 44 || May 21 || at  || Iowa Field • Iowa City, Iowa || 2–6 || 34–10 || 14–3
|- align="center" bgcolor="#ccffcc"
| 45 || May 21 || at Iowa || Iowa Field • Iowa City, Iowa || 10–1 || 35–10 || 15–3
|-

|-
|-
! style="" | Postseason
|- valign="top"

|- align="center" bgcolor="#ccffcc"
| 46 || May 26 ||  || Bierman Field • Minneapolis, Minnesota || 7–0 || 36–10 || 15–3
|- align="center" bgcolor="#ccffcc"
| 47 || May 27 ||  || Bierman Field • Minneapolis, Minnesota || 13–2 || 37–10 || 15–3
|- align="center" bgcolor="#ccffcc"
| 48 || May 29 || Florida || Bierman Field • Minneapolis, Minnesota || 5–1 || 38–10 || 15–3
|-

|- align="center" bgcolor="#ffcccc"
| 49 || June 11 || vs Cal State Los Angeles || Johnny Rosenblatt Stadium • Omaha, Nebraska || 4–7 || 38–11 || 15–3
|- align="center" bgcolor="#ccffcc"
| 50 || June 12 || vs  || Johnny Rosenblatt Stadium • Omaha, Nebraska || 4–3 || 39–11 || 15–3
|- align="center" bgcolor="#ffcccc"
| 51 || June 14 || vs Arizona State || Johnny Rosenblatt Stadium • Omaha, Nebraska || 4–8 || 39–12 || 15–3
|-

|-
|

Awards and honors 
Brian Denman
 First Team All-Big Ten

Jeff Neutzling
 First Team All-Big Ten

References 

Minnesota Golden Gophers baseball seasons
Minnesota Golden Gophers baseball
Big Ten Conference baseball champion seasons
Minnesota
College World Series seasons